Kópavogskirkja is a church in Kópavogur, Iceland. It is located on Borgarholt hill at the top of Kársnes and offers a great view over Kópavogur, Reykjavík and surrounding area.

Work on it began in 1958 and it was opened on December 16, 1963. The architectural style of Kópavogskirkja is modernist.  Its architecture is unusual, it is the cross section of two wide arches.  A curved arch protrudes in each direction with smaller arches extending below. Its profile is prominent in the Kópavogur town seal. 

Architect Hörður Bjarnason together with Ragnar Emilsson designed this church.  The church attracts the attention of both Icelanders and foreign tourists. The altarpiece in the church was set up in 1990 and is by artist Steinunni Þórarinsdóttir.
Artist Barbara  Árnason (1911–1975) designed various pictures that are in the church.
Sculptor  Gerður Helgadóttir (1928–1975) designed a sculptor.

References

External links
Official website
Kópavogskirkja on the Icelandic Church Map

Kópavogur
Churches in Iceland